Palghat R. Raghu (9 January 1928 – 2 June 2009) was a Carnatic musician and percussionist. He was awarded the Madras Music Academy's Sangeetha Kalanidhi in 2007.

Early life
Palghat Ramaswamy Raghu was born in Rangoon, Burma (now Myanmar) to Palghat Ramaswamy Iyer and Ananthalakshmi Ammal. As a child, he was immensely talented and inducted into mridangam lessons very early in his life. His first mridangam lessons were from Tinniam Venkatarama Iyer and Trichy Raghava Iyer. Later he learnt the art from Palghat T. S. Mani Iyer, to whose niece, Swarnambal, he was married. He was a graduate of mathematics.

Awards
 Sangeet Natak Akademi Award in 1983
 Palghat Mani Iyer award (first recipient)
 Padma Shri in year 1985
 Mridangam Chakravarty award
 Kerala Sangeetha Nataka Akademi Fellowship in 1979
 Kalaimamani (Tamil Nadu)
 Sangeetha Choodamani by Sri Krishna Gana Sabha, Chennai (1978)
 Mridangam Nada Mani (Shankaracharya)
 Nada Brahmam — award from Narada Gana Sabha( 2000)
 Nada Nidhi (2001)
 Sangeetha Kalanidhi (2007)

Legacy

Raghu toured extensively in Europe, United States, Australia, Malaysia and Singapore. He performed with artists such as Sitar Maestro Pandit Ravi Shankar, Flute Hariprasad Chaurasia, Santoor Shivkumar Sharma and Alla Rakha in numerous concerts in India and abroad. He had also been involved in East-West fusion music. He had been visiting professor of music at Wesleyan University in Connecticut, San Diego State University and University of California, Berkeley. He regularly conducted advanced mridangam classes for the benefit of his students and upcoming mridangam artists.

Palghat Raghu's grandsons are carnatic musician Abhishek Raghuram and mridangam artist Anantha R. Krishnan.

References

External links
 Official Website of Palghat R. Raghu
 Obituary in The Hindu newspaper

1928 births
2009 deaths
Mridangam players
Recipients of the Padma Shri in arts
Recipients of the Sangeet Natak Akademi Award
Sangeetha Kalanidhi recipients
Tamil musicians
Wesleyan University faculty
20th-century Indian musicians
20th-century drummers
Recipients of the Kerala Sangeetha Nataka Akademi Fellowship